Hassan Nasrallah (born 31 August 1960) is a Lebanese cleric and political leader who has served as the 3rd secretary-general of Hezbollah since his predecessor, Abbas al-Musawi, was assassinated by the Israel Defense Forces in February 1992.

Early life and education
Hasan Nasrallah was born the ninth of ten children into a Shia family in Bourj Hammoud, Matn District (an eastern suburb of Beirut) on 31 August 1960. His father, Abdul Karim Nasrallah, was born in Bazourieh, a village in Jabal Amel (South Republic of Lebanon) located near Tyre and worked as a fruit and vegetables seller. Although his family was not particularly religious, Hassan was interested in theological studies. He attended the al-Najah school and later a public school in the predominantly Christian neighborhood of Sin el Fil Beirut.

In 1975, the Lebanese Civil War forced the family, including Nasrallah who was 15 at the time, to move to their ancestral home in Bazourieh, where Nasrallah completed his secondary education at the public school of Sour (Tyre). There he attended secondary school, and briefly joined the Amal Movement, a Lebanese Shi'a political group.

Nasrallah studied at the Shi'a seminary in the Beqaa Valley town of Baalbek. The school followed the teachings of Iraqi-born Ayatollah Mohammad Baqir al-Sadr, who founded the Dawa movement in Najaf, Iraq during the early 1960s.

In 1976, aged sixteen, Nasrallah travelled to Iraq where he was admitted into Ayatollah al-Sadr’s seminary in Najaf. Al-Sadr is said to have recognised Nasrallah’s qualities and is quoted as saying “I scent in you the aroma of leadership; you are one of the Ansar [followers] of the Mahdi ...”. Nasrallah was expelled from Iraq, along with dozens of other Lebanese students, in 1978. Al-Sadr was imprisoned, tortured and brutally murdered. Nasrallah was forced to return to Lebanon in 1979, by that time having completed the first part of his study, as Saddam Hussein was expelling many Shia's, including Ruhollah Khomeini (Ayatollah Khomeini) and Abbas Musawi.
Back in Lebanon, he studied and taught at the school of Amal's leader Abbas al-Musawi, later being selected as Amal's political delegate in Beqaa, and making him a member of the central political office. Around the same time, in 1980, Saddam Hussein had Sadr executed.

Early activities

Nasrallah joined Hezbollah after the 1982 Israeli invasion of Lebanon. In 1989, Hassan Nasrallah traveled to Qom, Iran, where he furthered his religious studies.

Nasrallah believes that Islam holds the solution to the problems of any society, once saying, "With respect to us, briefly, Islam is not a simple religion including only prayers and praises, rather it is a divine message that was designed for humanity, and it can answer any question man might ask concerning his general and personal life. Islam is a religion designed for a society that can revolt and build a community."

In 1991, Nasrallah returned to Lebanon and replaced Musawi as Hezbollah's leader after the latter was killed by an Israeli airstrike the following year.

Leadership of Hezbollah 

Nasrallah became the leader of Hezbollah after the Israelis assassinated the previous leader, Musawi, in 1992. During Nasrallah's leadership, Hezbollah acquired rockets with a longer range, which allowed them to strike at northern Israel despite the Israeli occupation of southern Lebanon. In 1993 Israel carried out Operation Accountability. Much Lebanese infrastructure was destroyed during the operation, which Israel claimed was successful.  An agreement was eventually reached whereby, Israel ended its attacks in Lebanon and Hezbollah agreed to stop attacks on northern Israel.

However, after a short pause, hostilities resumed. In 1996 Israel launched Operation Grapes of Wrath, blocking important Lebanese harbour cities and bombing a Syrian military base. After 16 days of Israeli attacks in Lebanon, the Israeli–Lebanese Ceasefire Understanding was agreed upon. Again, Hezbollah agreed to stop rocket attacks in exchange for Israel halting its attacks. However, as in 1993, the peace did not last for long.

In Israel, it was increasingly debated whether the presence of Israeli forces in southern Lebanon was working, since it was clear that the 'security zone' could not stop Hezbollah rockets reaching into Israel. After heavy Israeli casualties in south lebanon, some Israeli politicians argued that the conflict would only end if Israel withdrew from Lebanon. In 2000 Ehud Barak finally withdrew Israeli forces from Lebanon. Following the Israeli withdrawal, the South Lebanon Army, which was supported by Israel, was quickly overrun by Hezbollah. Some SLA members escaped to Israel, but many were captured by Hezbollah. This success against Israel greatly increased Hezbollah's popularity within Lebanon and the Islamic world.

Consequently, Nasrallah is credited in Lebanon and the Arab world for ending the Israeli occupation of the South of Lebanon, something which has greatly bolstered the party's political standing within Lebanon.

Nasrallah played a major role in a complex prisoner exchange deal between Israel and Hezbollah in 2004, resulting in hundreds of Palestinian and Lebanese prisoners being freed and many human remains, including that of his son, being returned to Lebanon. The agreement was described across the Arab world as a magnificent victory for Hezbollah, and Nasrallah was personally praised for achieving these gains.

A December article in the London-based Asharq Al-Awsat stated that command of the organization's military wing was transferred from Nasrallah to his deputy, Na'im Qasim in August 2007. Hezbollah denied this suggestion, declaring it an attempt to "weaken the popularity" of the movement.

In October 2008, Hashim Safi Al Din, his cousin, was assigned to succeed Nasrallah as secretary general of Hezbollah.

Widespread protests in Lebanon in October 2019 due to a deepening financial and economic crisis put pressure on the government leaders to resign, including the subject.

Under his tenure, Hezbollah has been designated a terrorist organization, either wholly or in part, by the United States and other nations, as well as by the European Union. Russia rejects the claims that Hezbollah is a terrorist organization, and considers Hezbollah a legitimate sociopolitical organization. China remains neutral, and maintains contacts with Hezbollah.

Memorandum of Understanding with Free Patriotic Movement 
Nasrallah negotiated a Memorandum of Understanding with the Free Patriotic Movement headed by Michel Aoun, the former premier and a Maronite Christian. Aoun described the ten-point MoU in an op-ed in The Wall Street Journal published on 31 July 2006. Hezbollah agreed to disarm upon the return of its prisoners and the occupied Shebaa Farms. It also agreed to the pardon and return of fugitive South Lebanon Army (SLA) members. The Free Patriotic Movement in turn agreed to work for reform of the confessional electoral system of the Parliament of Lebanon and move it in the direction of one man, one vote. Aoun made the point that the political process was in effect disarming Hezbollah without any loss in lives from unnecessary wars. Critics of this agreement say that is not very clear concerning the disarmament, and that it served to strengthen Hezbollah internally, giving it a non-Shiite cover inside .

2006 Israel–Lebanon conflict

Following an ambush by Hezbollah in Israeli territory that left three soldiers dead and two abducted, the 2006 Lebanon War started. During the war Israeli bombardments seeking Hezbollah targets caused damage in many parts of Beirut, especially the poorer and largely Shiite South Beirut, which is controlled by Hezbollah. On 3 August 2006, Hasan Nasrallah vowed to strike Tel Aviv in retaliation for Israel's bombardment of Lebanon's capital. "If you hit Beirut, the Islamic resistance will hit Tel Aviv and is able to do that with God's help," Nasrallah said in a televised address. He added that Hezbollah forces were inflicting heavy casualties on Israeli ground troops.

During the conflict, Nasrallah came under intense criticism from Arab countries, including Jordan, Egypt, and Saudi Arabia. Jordan's King Abdullah II and Egyptian President Hosni Mubarak warned on 14 July of the risk of "the region being dragged into adventurism that does not serve Arab interests," while the Saudi Foreign Minister Prince Saud Al-Faisal called the Hezbollah attacks "unexpected, inappropriate and irresponsible acts." He went further, saying, "These acts will pull the whole region back to years ago, and we cannot simply accept them."

Nasrallah also came under intense criticism from some in Lebanon. Walid Jumblatt, leader of the Progressive Socialist Party of the Republic of Lebanon and the most prominent leader of the Druze community, spoke out quite forcefully: "Great, so he's a hero. But I'd like to challenge this heroism of his. I have the right to challenge it, because my country is in flames. Besides, we did not agree". Jumblatt is also quoted as saying: "He is willing to let the Lebanese capital burn while he haggles over terms of surrender".

Following the war, came what is known as the "Green Flood" (Al-sayl al-akhdhar), according to Iranian-born journalist Amir Taheri. "This refers to the massive amounts of U.S. dollar notes that Hezbollah is distributing among all the citizens that were effected from the war in Beirut and the south. The dollars from Iran are ferried to Beirut via Syria and distributed through networks of militants. Anyone who can prove that his home was damaged in the war receives $12,000, a tidy sum in wartorn Lebanon".

In a TV interview aired on Lebanon's New TV station on 27 August 2006, Nasrallah said that he would not have ordered the capture of two Israeli soldiers if he had known it would lead to such a war: "We do not think, even one percent, that the capture led to a war at this time and of this magnitude. I'm convinced and sure that this war was planned and that the capture of these hostages was just their excuse to start their pre-planned war, but if I had known on July 11 ... that the operation would lead to such a war, would I do it? I say no, absolutely not".

Syrian Civil War
On 25 May 2013, Nasrallah announced that Hezbollah is fighting in the Syrian civil war against "Islamist extremists" and "pledged that his group will not allow Syrian militants to control areas that border Lebanon". He confirmed that Hezbollah was fighting in the strategic Syrian town of Qusair on the same side as the Syrian army. In the televised address, he said, "If Syria falls in the hands of America, Israel and the takfiris, the people of our region will go into a dark period."

In July 2014, Nasrallah's nephew was killed fighting in Syria.

Personal life
Nasrallah lives in South Beirut with his wife Fatimah Yasin (who comes from the Lebanese village of Al-Abbasiyah) and four of his children: Muhammad Javed, Zainab, Muhammad Ali and Muhammad Mahdi.

On the night of 12/13 September 1997 four Hizbullah fighters were killed in an Israeli ambush near Mlikh. One of the dead was 18-year-old Muhammad Hadi, Nasrallah’s eldest son. Five Lebanese soldiers and a woman were killed in a simultaneous airstrike north of the ’security zone’. The attacks were seen as a response to the operation a week earlier in which twelve Israeli commandos were killed. Nasrallah is quoted as saying on receiving the news of his son’s death “I am proud to be the father of one of the martyrs”. When the IDF released photos of his son’s body and offered to exchange it for body parts of those killed in the earlier ambush his response was “Keep it. We have many more men like Hadi ready to offer themselves to the struggle”. There was a seven day mourning period held in south Beirut which was attended by an estimated 200,000 people daily.

Views on international politics

Pre-2000 Israeli occupation of Lebanon
"If we are to expel the Israeli occupation from our country, how do we do this? We noticed what happened in Palestine, in the West Bank, in the Gaza Strip, in the Golan, in the Sinai. We reached a conclusion that we cannot rely on the Arab League states, nor on the United Nations .... The only way that we have is to take up arms and fight the occupation forces."

On Israel and the Arab-Israeli conflict

In an interview with The Washington Post, in 2000, Nasrallah said "I am against any reconciliation with Israel. I do not even recognize the presence of a state that is called 'Israel.' I consider its presence both unjust and unlawful. That is why if Lebanon concludes a peace agreement with Israel and brings that accord to the Parliament our deputies will reject it; Hezbollah refuses any conciliation with Israel in principle."
On 26 May 2000, after the Israeli withdrawal from south Lebanon Hasan Nassrallah said: "I tell you: this "Israel" that owns nuclear weapons and the strongest air force in this region is more fragile than a spiderweb."

In 2006, Nasrallah said "There is no solution to the conflict in this region except with the disappearance of Israel."
Despite declaring "death to Israel" and "death to America" in his public appearances, Nasrallah said in an interview to The New Yorker in 2003, "At the end of the road, no one can go to war on behalf of the Palestinians, even if that one is not in agreement with what the Palestinians agreed on." When asked in 2004 whether he was prepared to live with a two-state settlement between Israel and Palestine, he said he would not sabotage what is a "Palestinian matter", but that until such a settlement is reached, he will continue to encourage Palestinian resistance.
On 30 November 2009, while reading the party's new political manifesto, Hasan Nasrallah declared "Our problem with [the Israelis] is not that they are Jews, but that they are occupiers who are raping our land and holy places."
Speaking on Al Quds Day on 2 August 2013, Nasrallah said that Israel "is a cancer that must be eradicated."

On 11 September 2001 attacks and the United States
"What do the people who worked in those two World Trade Center towers, along with thousands of employees, women and men, have to do with war that is taking place in the Middle East? ? ... Therefore we condemned this act—and any similar act we condemn. ... I said nothing about the Pentagon, meaning we remain silent. We neither favored nor opposed that act .... Well, of course, the method of Osama bin Laden, and the fashion of bin Laden, we do not endorse them. And many of the operations that they have carried out, we condemned them very clearly."

Views attributed to Nasrallah

According to Saudi state-owned Al Arabiya, a video posted on their site is of Nasrallah giving a speech circa 1988 in which he states, "Our plan, to which we, as faithful believers, have no alternative, is to establish an Islamic state ... Lebanon should not be an Islamic republic on its own, but rather, part of the Greater Islamic Republic, governed by the Master of Time [the Mahdi], and his rightful deputy, the Jurisprudent Ruler, Imam Khomeini," 
According to the pro-Israeli group CAMERA, Nasrallah stated that "The Lebanese refuse to give the Palestinians residing in Lebanon Lebanese citizenship, and we refuse their resettlement in Lebanon. There is Lebanese consensus on this... we thank God that we all agree on one clear and definite result; namely, that we reject the resettlement of the Palestinians in Lebanon." There is broad consensus in Lebanon against the permanent resettlement of Palestinians, due to fears that it could reignite Lebanon's civil war. Likewise, Palestinian refugees in Lebanon consistently favor right of return over Lebanese naturalization.
Lebanese writer, Amal Saad-Ghorayeb quotes Hasan Nasrallah as saying, "If we searched the entire world for a person more cowardly, despicable, weak and feeble in psyche, mind, ideology and religion, we would not find anyone like the Jew. Notice, I do not say the Israeli." Charles Glass questions the attribution of the quote to Nasrallah, noting that both the footnote in Saad-Ghorayeb's book and her original dissertation instead attribute the quote to an interview she conducted with a Hezbollah member of the Lebanese Parliament, Muhammad Fneish.
According to Israeli military source Shaul Shay, Nasrallah has often made anti-Semitic statements that not only revile Israel as a state, but also the entire Jewish people, while using themes taken from classic and Muslim antisemitism. Two of the claims he makes are that:
In a 1998 speech marking the Day of Ashura, and published in what was Hasan Nasrallah's official website at that time, Nasrallah referred to Israel as "the state of the grandsons of apes and pigs – the Zionist Jews" and condemned them as "the murderers of the prophets." The Committee for Accuracy in Middle East Reporting in America (CAMERA), a pro-Israel media watchdog group, MEMRI, and Shaul Shai interpret this language as broadly antisemitic.
Nasrallah said in a speech delivered in Beirut and aired on Al-Manar TV on 28 September 2001: "What do the Jews want? They want security and money. Throughout history the Jews have been Allah's most cowardly and avaricious creatures. If you look all over the world, you will find no one more miserly or greedy than they are."
According to Newsweek, the Israel Ministry of Foreign Affairs and Robert Satloff, in a speech carried during Ashura on 9 April 2000, Hasan Nasrallah said that: "The Jews invented the legend of the Nazi atrocities. It is clear that the numbers they talk about are greatly exaggerated".

Journalist Badih Chayban in a 23 October 2002 article in The Daily Star wrote that Nasrallah said, "If they [the Jews] all gather in Israel, it will save us the trouble of going after them worldwide." Charles Glass believes that the quotation was likely a fabrication, citing other published accounts of Nasrallah's speech that had no reference to the anti-Semitic comment, and unconfirmed statements by an unnamed person who Glass said is the editor-in-chief of the Lebanese newspaper which published the quotes, that questioned both the translation and the "agenda of the translator." However, the Nasrallah speech in question is published on Hezbollah's website. Mr. Chayban shared this link with Mr. Glass, who did not correct his accusations accordingly. Glass also wrote that a Hezbollah spokeswoman, Wafa Hoteit, denied that Nasrallah made the statement. More recently, the relevant excerpt from the speech, along with Arabic transcription and English translation, have been published online here.
According to the US-Israeli organisation MEMRI, in a speech aired on Al-Manar and Al-Jazeera in 2006, Nasrallah expressed support for Holocaust denier Roger Garaudy calling him a "great French philosopher" who "proved (sic) that this Holocaust is a myth".
During the 2006 Jyllands-Posten Muhammad cartoons controversy, Nasrallah declared in a speech aired on Al-Manar TV and Al-Jazeera TV that: "If there had been a Muslim to carry out Imam Khomeini's fatwā against the renegade Salman Rushdie, this rabble who insult our Prophet Mohammed in Denmark, Norway and France would not have dared to do so. I am sure there are millions of Muslims who are ready to give their lives to defend our prophet's honour and we have to be ready to do anything for that."
On 24 February 2012, in a speech in Nabi Sheet for the "remembrance of the fallen martyrs Abbas al-Musawi, Ragheb Harb, and Imad Mughniyah," Hasan Nasrallah said, "I say that the American administration and the American mentality lacks nothing from Satanism. But that kind of behavior and that kind of mistreatment of holy books [referring to the Quran burning incident in Afghanistan in February 2012] and prophets, and the prophets' sanctities, and others' sanctities; this behavior is Israeli and let us say it is Jewish, between quotation marks, – now they will say that this is anti-Semitism – [but] the Holy Quran told us about this people: how they attacked their prophets, and how they killed their prophets, and how they affronted their prophets, and how they affronted Jesus Christ, peace be upon him, and how they affronted Mary, peace be upon her, and how they affronted Allah's great messenger Mohammad, May God exalt and bring peace upon him and his family. This [behavior] pattern about affronting holy books, and prophets, and messengers, and sanctities; this is their mentality, and maybe they want to push things more and more toward a religious war worldwide."
On 2 September, a day after rocket strikes toward Israeli's border, Hassan Nasrallah said Hezbollah would begin targeting Israeli drones flying in Lebanese airspace, and announced there were "no more red lines" in the fight against Israel. If attacked again, he said, Hezbollah would strike "deep inside" Israel.

Alleged 2008 assassination attempt
Almalaf, an Iraqi news source on 15 October 2008, quoted sources in Lebanon saying Hezbollah leader Hasan Nasrallah had been poisoned the previous week and that he was saved by Iranian doctors who went to Lebanon to treat him. The sources told the paper that a particularly poisonous chemical substance was used against the Shi'a militia leader. His medical condition was apparently critical for several days until Iranian doctors came and managed to save his life. Almalaf claimed that the sources believed it was highly likely that the poisoning was an Israeli assassination attempt.

Hezbollah denied that Nasrallah had been poisoned. Lebanese parliament member Al-Hajj Hassan, a member of Hezbollah, said: "This is a lie and a fabrication. It's true that I haven't seen Nasrallah this past week, but he's okay." The Iranian doctors arrived on Sunday at approximately 11:00 P.M., apparently on a special military flight. According to Almalaf officials considered flying Nasrallah to Iran for further treatment.

In September 1997, an Israeli Mossad team tried to assassinate Hamas political chief Khaled Mashal by drizzling poison in his ear. The attempt failed, and two of the agents were captured while others took refuge in the Israeli embassy in Amman. Nasrallah's second-in-command Imad Mughniyah was assassinated in February 2008 in a Damascus bomb blast. Hezbollah accused Israel of responsibility for the explosion, although Israel denied responsibility for the act. Nasrallah's predecessor Abbas al-Musawi was killed in an Israeli airstrike in southern Lebanon in 1992.

Nasrallah's denial of the alleged attempt
On 25 October 2008 in an interview with the Hezbollah owned Al-Manar channel, Nasrallah denied the assassination attempt, accusing the Israelis and Americans of fabricating the story and considering it as part of the ongoing psychological war against Hezbollah that aimed to imply that the party was suffering from internal disputes and assassination plots.

He also explained that "if research was done on the internet websites posting such unfounded information, it would reveal that they are all being run from that same dark room, and that their aim is to serve American-Israeli interests."

He added that at first the organization had considered denying the false information with a written message, "but when the news agencies began to publish it we decided to hold a televised interview, and here I am before you telling you I was not poisoned."

Image 
By playing a key part in ending the Israeli occupation, Nasrallah became a "national hero". The New York Times article reported that an Arab politician called him as the "most powerful man in the Middle East" and the "only Arab leader who actually does what he says he’s going to do". Al Jazeera compared him to other Arab leaders such as Yasser Arafat and Gamal Abdel Nasser, and leftist revolutionaries like Che Guevara and Fidel Castro, while journalist Annia Ciezadlo described him as an "emblem of Islam and Arab pride". Professor Amal Saad-Ghorayeb said that he is "passionate" but also "plainspoken and practical".

Nasrallah is often referred to as "al-Sayyid Hassan", the honorific "Sayyid" denoting a claim of descent from the Islamic prophet Muhammad through his grandson Husain ibn Ali.

In popular culture

Two popular songs were written about Nasrallah during the 2006 Israel–Hezbollah War, with vastly different views of the Hezbollah leader: The Hawk of Lebanon in the West Bank and Gaza Strip, and Yalla Ya Nasrallah, against Nasrallah, in Israel.

In 2007, Lebanese singer Alaa Zalzali composed a tribute song entitled "Ya Nasrallah". Another popular song composed in tribute to him was by Lebanese Christian singer Julia Boutros, called "Ahebba'i" meaning "my loved ones", which was inspired by Nasrallah's words in a televised message he sent to Hezbollah fighters in southern Lebanon during the 2006 War.

See also 
 Iran–Lebanon relations
 Bashar Assad
 Ali Khamenei

References

Sources

Further reading
Bergman, Ronen. "The Fall of Hezbollah’s Leader." Bloomberg. 24 June 2013.

External links

"The Multilingual Website of Sayyed Hassan Nasrallah"  Updated source of contents related to him in 31 languages. Its archive is being completed from the link below:
"The Multilingual Page of Sayyed Hassan Nasrallah" 
"Hizballah: A Primer", Lara Deeb, 31 July 2006
"Inside the Mind of Hezbollah", Washington Post, 16 July 2006.
Nasrallah: Israel temporary country YNET
"Seyyed Hasan Nasrallah's Autobiography", Ya Lesarat Ol-Hoseyn (Tehran), Federation of American Scientists Intelligence Resource Program, 10 August 2006

Speeches and interviews
 Nasrallah's Sun Video
 Speech given on 26 May 2008
 
 Interview on 11 August 2007
 Interview with Al-Jazeera on 20 July 2006
 Speech on 8 August 2006
 Speech on 3 August 2006
 Speech on 31 July 2006
 Speech on 14 July 2006
 Speech on 8 March 2005
Video Clip of Victory Speech on 22 September 2006
Interview with Al-Jazeera
The Beirut File: An Interview with Hassan Nasrallah by Mahir Tan (May 2003)

1960 births
Lebanese Islamists
Lebanese Shia clerics
Lebanese Shia Muslims
Living people
People from Matn District
People from South Lebanon
Secretaries-general of Hezbollah